Gaylussite is a carbonate mineral, a hydrated sodium calcium carbonate, formula Na2Ca(CO3)2·5H2O.  It occurs as translucent, vitreous white to grey to yellow monoclinic prismatic crystals. It is an unstable mineral which dehydrates in dry air and decomposes in water.

Discovery and occurrence
It is formed as an evaporite from alkali lacustrine waters. It also occurs rarely as veinlets in alkalic igneous rocks. It was first described in 1826 for an occurrence in Lagunillas, Mérida, Venezuela. It was named for French chemist Joseph Louis Gay-Lussac (1778–1850).

The mineral has been recently (2014) reported from drill core in Lonar lake in Buldhana district, Maharashtra, India. Lonar lake was created by a meteor impact during the Pleistocene Epoch and it is one of only four known hyper-velocity impact craters in basaltic rock anywhere on Earth.

References

Sodium minerals
Calcium minerals
Carbonate minerals
Monoclinic minerals
Minerals in space group 15
Evaporite
Luminescent minerals
Minerals described in 1826